Insaf Ki Pukar is a  1987 Indian Hindi-language action film, produced by Raj Bhaktiani and Ramesh Gwalani under the Shivkala Movies banner and directed by T. Rama Rao. It stars Dharmendra, Jeetendra, Anita Raj and Bhanupriya, with music composed by Laxmikant–Pyarelal. The film was remade in Tamil as Guru Sishyan (1988) and Telugu as Guru Sishyulu in 1990.

Plot 
Soon-to-be released convicts Vijay and Ajay meet Manohar, who has been sentenced to death. He tells them that his sister was kidnapped by a taxi driver, then raped and murdered by Dinesh Lal, younger brother of a plutocrat Dhani Lal. The Lals, Dhani Lal's partner Sohan Lal and corrupt Inspector Imaandar framed Manohar for the taxi driver's murder. Vijay and Ajay decide to clear Manohar's name, and stall his execution by fracturing his leg. After release, they gain control over Imaandar, by which Vijay infiltrates the Lals' services as a bodyguard for Dinesh Lal. Besides, Ajay traps Rani daughter of Dhani Lal. In tandem, Vijay loves Sheela, daughter of Imaandar. Soon enough, they realise that Manohar's parents are held captive by Dhani Lal since Jagannath, father of Manohar, is aware of a hidden treasure. After rescuing them, Ajay recognises them as his parents from whom he was separated in childhood. Vijay recognises Jagannath as the murderer of his parents. Jagannath reveals the truth: the actual culprit is Sohan Lal who murdered Vijay's parents wearing a mask of Jagannath. Eventually, Vijay and Ajay thwart their enemies, safeguard the treasure, and free Manohar.

Cast 

 Dharmendra as Vijay
 Jeetendra as Ajay
 Anita Raj as Sheela
 Bhanupriya as Rani
 Prem Chopra as Dhanilal
 Anupam Kher as Sohanlal
 Shakti Kapoor as Dinesh
 Kader Khan as Inspector Imaandaar
 Aruna Irani as Meena Imaandaar
 Shreeram Lagoo as Inspector Jagannath
 Ashalata Wabgaonkar as Mrs. Jagannath
 Om Shivpuri as Police Commissioner Ranjeet
 Avinash Wadhavan as Manohar
 Tiku Talsania as Municipal Inspector Narayan Singh
 Mac Mohan as Solomon
 Satyen Kappu as Chacha

Soundtrack 
The music was composed by Laxmikant–Pyarelal, and Anand Bakshi wrote the songs.

References

External links 

1980s Hindi-language films
1980s masala films
1987 action films
1987 films
Films about miscarriage of justice
Films directed by T. Rama Rao
Films scored by Laxmikant–Pyarelal
Hindi films remade in other languages
Indian action films
Indian films about revenge
Treasure hunt films